Halim el-Roumi (July 1919 – 1983) was a singer and composer from Lebanon.

Born in Tyre, Lebanon. He began his amateur artistic career in 1935. Later, as a radio chief, he discovered the singer Fairuz. He composed her music, introduced her to the choir of Radio Liban and was the originator of her stage name. El-Roumi also became director of Radio libanaise.

He is famous for composing the poem La Volonté de vivre (إرادة الحياة) by the Tunisian poet Aboul-Qacem Echebbi for the Arab singer Souad Mohamed. He is the father of Majida Al Roumi.

References 

20th-century Lebanese male singers
Lebanese composers
Lebanese people of Palestinian descent
1919 births
1983 deaths
Palestine Melkite Greek Catholics
Lebanese Melkite Greek Catholics